IRIS (2-methoxy-5-ethoxy-4-methylamphetamine) is a lesser-known psychedelic drug and a substituted amphetamine. It is also the 5-ethoxy analog of DOM. IRIS was first synthesized by Alexander Shulgin. In his book PiHKAL, the minimum dosage is listed as 9 mg, and the duration unknown. IRIS produces few to no effects. Very little data exists about the pharmacological properties, metabolism, and toxicity of IRIS.

See also 
 Beatrice (psychedelic)
 Phenethylamine
 Psychedelics, dissociatives and deliriants

References

Substituted amphetamines
Phenol ethers